Kettleman may refer to:
 Kettleman City, California
 Kettleman Hills
 Kettleman North Dome Oil Field
 Betsy and Craig Kettleman, fictional characters in Better Call Saul
 Kettleman Hills Hazardous Waste Facility
 Kettleman's Bagel Co.